The list of ship decommissionings in 1872 includes a chronological list of all ships decommissioned in 1872.


See also 

1872
 Ship decommissionings